Scarlet River is a 1933 American pre-Code Western film directed by Otto Brower, written by Harold Shumate, and starring Tom Keene, Dorothy Wilson, Roscoe Ates, Lon Chaney Jr. and Edgar Kennedy. It was released on March 10, 1933, by RKO Pictures.

Plot

Cast
 Tom Keene as Tom Baxter 
 Dorothy Wilson as Judy Blake
 Lon Chaney Jr. as Jeff Todd (billed as Creighton Chaney, his birth name
 Roscoe Ates as Ulysses 
 Edgar Kennedy as Sam Gilroy 
 Hooper Atchley as 'Clink' McPherson
 Betty Furness as Babe Jewel
 Jack Raymond as Benny
 James Mason as Dummy 
 Yakima Canutt as Yak

Myrna Loy, Joel McCrea, Bruce Cabot and Rochelle Hudson have brief, uncredited cameos in an early scene at the film studio.

The director of photography was Nicholas Musuraca, who later worked with Jacques Tourneur on Cat People and Out of the Past.

References

External links
 
 
 
 

1933 films
American black-and-white films
RKO Pictures films
American Western (genre) films
1933 Western (genre) films
Films directed by Otto Brower
1930s English-language films
1930s American films